Sowghanlu (also Romanized as Sowghānlū and Sūghānlū; also known as Sakhanli and Sowqānlū) is a village in Yurchi-ye Gharbi Rural District, Kuraim District, Nir County, Ardabil Province, Iran. At the 2006 census, its population was 183, in 41 families.

References 

Towns and villages in Nir County